Milton, Virginia may refer to: 

Milton, Albemarle County, Virginia
Milton, Charles City County, Virginia
Milltown, Virginia, formerly Milton
Sharps, Virginia, formerly Milton